Sigillina is a genus of tunicates belonging to the family Holozoidae.

The species of this genus are found in coasts of Australia, Malesia, South Africa, Southernmost South America.

Species:

Sigillina australis 
Sigillina cyanea 
Sigillina digitata 
Sigillina exigua 
Sigillina fantasiana 
Sigillina grandissima 
Sigillina magalhaensis 
Sigillina moebiusi 
Sigillina nigra 
Sigillina pulvinus 
Sigillina signifera 
Sigillina vasta

References

Tunicates